Hippolytus (Hippolytos) is an Ancient Greek tragedy by Euripides, based on the myth of Hippolytus, son of Theseus. The play was first produced for the City Dionysia of Athens in 428 BC and won first prize as part of a trilogy.

Euripides first treated the myth in a previous play, Hippolytos Kalyptomenos ( – Hippolytus Veiled), which is now lost; what is known of it is based on echoes found in other ancient writings. The earlier play, and the one that has survived are both titled Hippolytus, but in order to distinguish the two they have traditionally been given the names, Hippolytus Kalyptomenos and Hippolytus Stephanophoros ( – "Hippolytus the wreath bearer"). It is thought that the contents to the missing Hippolytos Kalyptomenos portrayed a shamelessly lustful Phaedra, who directly propositioned Hippolytus, which apparently offended the play's audience.

Euripides revisits the myth in Hippolytos Stephanophoros, its title referring to the garlands Hippolytus wears as a worshipper of Artemis. In this version Phaedra fights against her own sexual desires, which have been incited by Aphrodite.

Synopsis

The play is set in Troezen, a coastal town in the north-eastern Peloponnese. Theseus, the king of Athens, is serving a year's voluntary exile after having murdered a local king and his sons. His illegitimate son is Hippolytus, whose birth is the result of Theseus's rape of the Amazon Hippolyta.  Hippolytus has been trained since childhood by the king of Troezen, Pittheus.

At the opening of the play Aphrodite, Goddess of love, explains that Hippolytus has sworn chastity and refuses to revere her. Instead, he honours the Goddess of the hunt, Artemis. This has led her to initiate a plan of vengeance on Hippolytus. When Hippolytus went to Athens two years previously Aphrodite inspired Phaedra, Hippolytus' stepmother, to fall in love with him.

Hippolytus appears with his followers and shows reverence to a statue of Artemis, a chaste goddess. A servant warns him about slighting Aphrodite, but Hippolytus refuses to listen.

The chorus, consisting of young married women of Troezen, enters and describes how Theseus's wife, Phaedra has not eaten or slept in three days. Phaedra, sickly, appears with her nurse. After an agonizing discussion, Phaedra finally confesses why she is ill: she loves Hippolytus. The nurse and the chorus are shocked. Phaedra explains that she must starve herself and die with her honour intact and to save Theseus from shame. However, the nurse quickly retracts her initial response and tells Phaedra that she has a magical charm to cure her. However, in an aside she reveals different plans.

The nurse, after making Hippolytus swear not to tell anyone, informs Hippolytus of Phaedra's desire and suggests that Hippolytus consider yielding to her. He reacts with a furious tirade and threatens to tell his father, Theseus, everything as soon as he arrives. Phaedra realizes disaster has fallen. After making the chorus swear secrecy, she goes inside and hangs herself.

Theseus returns and discovers his wife's dead body. Because the chorus is sworn to secrecy, they cannot tell Theseus why she killed herself. Theseus discovers a letter on Phaedra's body, which falsely asserts that she was raped by Hippolytus. Enraged, Theseus curses his son either to death or at least exile. To execute the curse, Theseus calls upon his father, the god Poseidon, who has promised to grant his son three wishes. Hippolytus enters and protests his innocence but cannot tell the truth because of the binding oath that he swore. Taking Phaedra's letter as proof, Hippolytus proudly defends his innocence, saying that he has never looked at any women with sexual desire. Theseus does not believe his son and still exiles him. As Hippolytus is departing he swears that if he lying then Zeus should strike him down on the spot. 

The chorus sings a lament for Hippolytus.

A messenger enters and describes a gruesome scene to Theseus; as Hippolytus got in his chariot to leave the kingdom, a bull roared out of the sea, frightening his horses, which dashed his chariot among the rocks, dragging Hippolytus behind. Hippolytus seems to be dying. The messenger protests Hippolytus' innocence, but Theseus refuses to believe him.

Theseus is glad that Hippolytus is suffering and about to die. But then the goddess, Artemis, appears and rages at Theseus for killing his own son; she brutally tells him the truth and that Aphrodite was behind all their suffering due to her feeling disrespected due to Hippolytus's pride in his chastity: there was no rape, Phaedra had lied, his son was innocent.  Theseus is painfully devastated by this revelation. Hippolytus is carried in physically battered and barely clinging to life. In the last moments of the play, Hippolytus forgives his father, kind words are exchanged between father and son, and then Hippolytus dies. Theseus is then left living to dwell on the fact that he killed his beloved son.

Interpretations

In this play, all characters, the humans and gods, have imperfections and can be jealous and brutal in vengeance. They all have blindnesses that keep them from seeing and understanding others with empathy and these blindnesses result in tragedy. The play presents two goddesses who represent two aspects of the human spirit in conflict: One aspect is love, represented by Aphrodite and personified by Phaedra.  The second aspect is what the play refers to as sophrosyne, which is represented by Artemis and personified by Hippolytus.  Sophrosyne can be defined in part as being chaste, pure, clear-headed and untainted by sexual desire.

Scholar Rachel Bruzzone argued in 2012 that Pygmalion in Book X of Ovid's Metamorphoses and Hippolytus share certain characteristics. The main antagonist of both stories is Aphrodite, who seeks revenge on both for insulting her by remaining virgins. They are also both obsessed with remaining pure. Both are misogynistic with Hippolytus believing that women are morally corrupt and will ruin his pureness. Pygmalion believes the same in that women are just lust-filled creatures that will ruin his pureness. But Pygmalion unlike Hippolytus does desire a woman, just one he deems as perfect which is one that does not speak, is nameless and compliant. Both have a love affair with a statue. Hippolytus's love affair is more subtle where he just says that his wife is a statue but Pygmalion actually marries his statue that is brought to life.

Texts
Barrett, W. S. (ed.), Euripides, Hippolytos, edited with Introduction and Commentary (Oxford: Clarendon Press, 1964; Toronto: Oxford University Press, 1964)

Translations 
Robert Potter, 1781
A. Mary F. Robinson, 1881, verse
Edward P. Coleridge, 1891, prose: full text
Gilbert Murray, 1911, verse: full text
Arthur Way, 1912, verse
H.D., verse, 1927
Augustus T. Murray, 1931, prose
David Grene, 1942, verse
Philip Vellacott, 1953, verse
F. L. Lucas, 1954, verse 
Robert Bagg, 1973. 
David Rudkin, 1981 Heinemann
David Kovacs, 1994, prose: full text
John Davie, 1996, prose
David Lan, 1998
James Morwood, 1998
Anne Carson, 2006. Grief Lessons: Four Plays by Euripides. New York Review Books Classics. .
George Theodoridis, 2010, prose: full text
Ian C. Johnston, 2016, verse: full text
Rachel Kitzinger, 2016 - verse

Adaptations
The tragic play Phèdre by Racine (1677)
The film Phaedra (1962), incorporating elements of the two versions written by Euripides

Notes

Further reading
Zeitlin, Froma (1996). "The power of Aphrodite: Eros and the boundaries of the self in Euripides' Hippolytos", in Froma Zeitlin, Playing the Other: Gender and Society in Classical Greek Literature. Chicago: University of Chicago Press. pp. 219–84.

External links
 
 
 
 Summary and analysis
 

Plays by Euripides
Theseus
Greek plays adapted into films
Plays set in ancient Greece
Phaedra
Fiction with false allegations of sex crimes
Plays based on classical mythology